Sarektjåkkå is the second highest mountain in Sweden and the highest mountain in the Laponian area at  AMSL.

Climbing
Sarektjåkkå is not easily accessible by any nearby roads, so the approach normally takes a day or more of backcountry hiking.

Accessing the north summit, at  altitude, is a moderate but steep hike up. An alternative route is to scale the summit from the south by merely steep hiking, but this requires crossing glaciers.

See also
 List of European ultra-prominent peaks

References

External links
 "Sarektjåhkkå, Sweden" on Peakbagger

Lapland (Sweden)
Mountains of Norrbotten County
Sarek National Park